Princess Louisa Inlet on the British Columbia Coast is  in length and lies at the north east end of Jervis Inlet. It is entered through Malibu Rapids off Queens Reach past Malibu, a former private resort and now youth camp. A portion of the area that makes up Princess Louisa Marine Provincial Park. James Bruce Falls and Chatterbox Falls are on Loquilts Creek, a large stream that enters the head of the inlet.

History

In June 1792 George Vancouver, charting the BC Coast in a search for the Northwest Passage, explored Jervis Inlet to its end, and found the entrance to Princess Louisa Inlet but did not enter as the tide was ebbing through Malibu Rapids at the time. In 1860 Captain George Richards surveyed and mapped Jervis and Princess Louisa Inlets naming it and surrounding features. In the same year Commander Richard Charles Mayne explored the valley at the head of the inlet hoping that it would lead to the interior of British Columbia.

James F. "Mac" MacDonald purchased the core of the park, in 1919 and donated it to the Princess Louisa International Society in 1953. It was acquired by BC Parks in 1964. Much of the remaining land surrounding the inlet has been acquired and added to the park in the following years. Hamilton Island, renamed MacDonald Island, is now a part of the park as well.

In 1940 Herman Caspar, who was rumored to have homesteaded at the entrance of the inlet, sold the land to Thomas F. Hamilton for $500. Casper was a squatter and had no legal right to the land. Hamilton, an American aviation executive, did buy all the land surrounding Princess Louisa Inlet with the intent on developing it with a series of themed luxury resorts to cater to visiting yachtsmen and Hollywood celebrities. However, only one resort was built at the entrance of the inlet, the Malibu Club which was named after Hamilton's yacht, the Malibu. In 1950, the resort was closed and abandoned due to a polio outbreak and quarantine. The property was later sold to Young Life in 1953 and has successfully operated it as a non-denominational Christian summer camp for teenagers.

Naming of the inlet

The inlet may have been named for Princess Louise, the fourth daughter of Queen Victoria, whose husband was the Marquess of Lorne, Governor General of Canada. The viceregal couple travelled extensively in Canada. Princess Louise spent three months in Victoria, in 1876 and was popular to the point that when the Governor General announced that the awaited completion of the transcontinental railway would pass through the Selkirk Mountains at the Kicking Horse Pass into what has since become Vancouver, rather than by the Yellowhead Pass to Bute Inlet and then to Victoria, Premier Robert Beaven asked Duke whether it would be possible for Vancouver Island to become a separate kingdom with Princess Louise as Queen. The more accepted theory is that the inlet is named for Queen Victoria's mother, Princess Victoria of Saxe-Coburg-Saalfeld, who was born Mary Louise Victoria.    The actual source of the name is uncertain. The adjacent Prince of Wales Reach was named after Edward VII when he was the Prince of Wales. Princess Royal Reach was named after Empress Frederick of Germany. Five mountains around Queens Reach are named after the children of Queen Victoria: Mount Victoria, Mount Alfred, Mount Alice, Mount Arthur and Mount Helena.

MacDonald Island
MacDonald Island is part of Princess Louisa Inlet in British Columbia, between the entrance of the inlet at Malibu Rapids to the head of the inlet at Chatterbox Falls.  It is a popular mooring place for it is one of the few shallow places of the deep fjord.  The island was originally named after the man who built a cabin at Chatterbox Falls - James F. MacDonald.  In 1940 the Island was renamed Hamilton Island after Thomas F. Hamilton, who built the Malibu Club and purchased the land from MacDonald for $18,000.  In 1972, the land's name reverted to the original name of MacDonald Island.

Access
The area is a popular destination for boaters and can also be accessed by float plane from various locations around the Strait of Georgia and water taxi from Earls Cove.

Gallery

See also
 Robert Genn Canadian landscape painter of Chatterbox Falls

References

External links
 

Fjords of British Columbia
Sunshine Coast Regional District
New Westminster Land District
Inlets of British Columbia